Wat Chayamangkalaram (also called as the Chayamangkalaram Buddhist Temple) is a Thai temple in Pulau Tikus suburb of George Town, Penang, Malaysia. Situated in Kelawei Road, the temple located close to the Dhammikarama Burmese Temple. It is the oldest Malaysian Siamese temple in the state. The temple became a focal point for the annual Siamese Songkran and Loi Krathong festivals within the city suburb and for the city yearly Buddha Day procession.

History 
The site for the temple was cleared in 1795 after a piece of land was granted to both Burmese and Siamese community in George Town by Queen Victoria during the Straits Settlements era. In 1830, there were around 648 Burmese and Siamese people in Penang, which then had a population of 40,000. Part of the land awarded to the Siamese was given as a diplomatic gesture to promote trading ties between the British Empire and the Siamese Rattanakosin Kingdom, which was presented by the then-Governor of the Straits Settlements, William John Butterworth to two Siamese female trustees named Nankayo and Boonsoon as the community representatives. Inscriptions also showed that the building of the temple had been largely due to the philanthropic efforts of local Chinese Buddhists.

In 1845, the temple was founded in the given land by Phra Phorthan Kuad, a powerful monk which according to the local legend was also very fond of asam laksa. Subsequently, making the dish become a normal offering by devotees when visiting his shrine in the temple. In 1948, the temple was officially named "Wat Chayamangkalaram". Since its establishment, the temple has undergone several renovations, with the addition of other structures. A reclining Buddha statue named Phra Chaiya Mongkol was constructed in the temple in 1958 with a total cost of M$100,000 (Malayan dollars). In 1962, the temple was visited by the King of Thailand, Bhumibol Adulyadej and Queen Sirikit as part of their state visit to Malaya.

Features 
The temple features one of the world's longest reclining Buddha statues as well as several coloured statues of Yakshas and other mythical creatures. Several smaller statues of the Buddha in various poses and of the Devas can be seen throughout the temple, particularly adorning the main prayer hall.

Gallery

References

External links 
 

Religious buildings and structures completed in 1845
1845 establishments in the Straits Settlements
Buddhist temples in Malaysia
Religious buildings and structures in Penang
Tourist attractions in George Town, Penang
Overseas Thai Buddhist temples
Thai Theravada Buddhist temples and monasteries
19th-century Buddhist temples